is a Japanese shōjo manga written by Shun'ichi Yukimuro and drawn by Shizue Takanashi. The series has been adapted as an anime television series, broadcast in Japan from 1981 to 1982 for 66 episodes, and a theatrical movie released in 1982. In 1981, it received the Kodansha Manga Award for the shōjo category.

Plot 
Spank (voiced by Noriko Tsukase), the main character and regular protagonist, is a dog whose owner went missing on the high seas. While awaiting his return Spank strays at the beach every day. One day he meets Aiko Morimura (voiced by Mari Okamoto), a junior high school student, whose father also went missing on a yacht tour ten years ago. Her mother, a designer of hats, left for Paris, leaving Aiko in the care of her uncle, Mr. Fujinami. Abandoned, Aiko believes that her father is still alive and awaits his return. She's recently lost her pet dog, Papi, a good-bye present from her mother, in a  car accident, leaving her totally devastated. In the course of the anime, Spank begins to lighten up her gloomy mood as he is a clumsy, merry, big-hearted dog. Whereas, Spank finds his love in the pet cat of Aiko's classmate. However, later, he finds in love with a blue dog named Fan Fan. At the end of the anime, despite Spank ruining everything, all will be forgiven cheerfully and all will really fall in love.

Characters

Regular 
  A little white dog with black/brown ears.
  A cat that is a rival but occasional friend of Spank.
  A 14-year-old girl. She is Spank's reluctant master.

Main 
  Aiko and Ryo's friend.
  Aiko and Shinako's friend. He enjoys art like his friend Shinako.
  Baron's master.
  A snobby rich girl. She is the same age as Aiko and her pet is a female cat named Cat.
 Oyama - Torakichi's master.
 Cat - A female cat that is a snob like her master Serino. Torakichi and Spank have a crush on her.
 Fan Fan - A cute little dog. Spank have a crush on her.
 Baron - A dog friend of Torakichi and Spank.

References

External links 

 
 

1979 manga
1981 anime television series debuts
1989 anime television series debuts
1994 anime television series debuts
1982 anime films
Comedy anime and manga
Fictional dogs
Kodansha manga
Shōjo manga
TV Tokyo original programming
TMS Entertainment
Winner of Kodansha Manga Award (Shōnen)